Marcos Antonio Giménez Vera (born 25 January 1991) is a Paraguayan professional footballer who plays as a midfielder for Deportivo Camba Cuá.

Club career
Giménez started in Libertad's system, making his debut in the 2011 Paraguayan Primera División on 24 April against Cerro Porteño; he also played versus Tacuary as Libertad placed third. Tacuary loaned Giménez in January 2012. They were relegated at the end of the year, with the midfielder playing twenty-five times. In the next two years, Giménez featured on loan for both General Díaz and Rubio Ñu - participating in eight fixtures. On 2 August 2016, Giménez signed for Ecuadorian Serie B's Técnico Universitario. 2017 saw Giménez join Sarmiento of Torneo Federal A. He made seven appearances.

In mid-2018, having departed Sarmiento, Giménez moved down to Torneo Federal C with Deportivo Curupay. They'd, due to AFA restructuring, eventually head into Torneo Regional Federal Amateur, where he appeared in eight fixtures and scored three goals. In 2020, Giménez joined fellow fourth tier side Deportivo Camba Cuá.

International career
In 2011, Giménez represented Paraguay at the South American U-20 Championship in Peru; winning four caps in the process.

Career statistics
.

References

External links

1991 births
Living people
Sportspeople from Luque
Paraguayan footballers
Paraguay under-20 international footballers
Association football midfielders
Paraguayan expatriate footballers
Expatriate footballers in Argentina
Expatriate footballers in Ecuador
Paraguayan expatriate sportspeople in Argentina
Paraguayan expatriate sportspeople in Ecuador
Paraguayan Primera División players
Ecuadorian Serie B players
Torneo Federal A players
Club Libertad footballers
Club Tacuary footballers
General Díaz footballers
Club Rubio Ñu footballers
C.D. Técnico Universitario footballers
Sarmiento de Resistencia footballers